Streptomyces spectabilis is a bacterium species from the genus of Streptomyces. Streptomyces spectabilis produces hangtaimycin, gentamicin, kanamycin, neomycin B, sisomycin, tobramycin, paromomycin, spectinabilin, spectinomycin, aminocyclitol, actinospectacin, prodigiosine and the streptovaricin complex.

Further reading

See also
 List of Streptomyces species

References

External links
Type strain of Streptomyces spectabilis at BacDive -  the Bacterial Diversity Metadatabase	

spectabilis
Bacteria described in 1961